FC Gagra is a Georgian football club, which competes in Erovnuli Liga, the first tier of Georgian league system. 

The club has its origins in Gagra, Abkhazia. It was founded in Tbilisi by former player and coach Goderdzi Chikhradze and his cousin in 2004 with a plan to move the club to Gagra in the end, but due to the enduring Abkhaz–Georgian conflict the team plays its home games in Tbilisi.
 
FC Gagra is the only non-top flight Georgian team, which has twice won the national Cup.

History

First years, 2004-2010

The new club was formed as FC Gagra in 2004 in Regionuli Liga, where they won promotion to  Pirveli Liga.
After winning their second-tier division, Gagra lost the promotion play-off in 2005–06 and 2006–07. In 2007–08, they again lost the promotion play-off, but after some withdrawals in the Umaglesi Liga the team was finally promoted.
In the 2008–09 season, the team played in the top league, but were to be relegated in the end. Gagra avoided relegation only after higher placed teams withdrew from the league.

Prolific decade, 2011-21
Gagra won the first League of 2010–2011 season, and became the winner of the Georgian Cup by defeating three-time winners FC Torpedo Kutaisi 1–0 after extra time.

In every season since the relegation to Liga 2 in 2012, Gagra were considered tough rivals aiming at the first division with 5th place being the worst final position. Overall, the club took part in Erovnuli Liga playoffs six times in sixteen years, although failed to overcome their opponents until 2021 when they beat Shukura and returned to the top flight after a ten-year absence.

Gagra's performance in David Kipiani Cup has proved successful. As a second-league team, they reached the final in 2018 for the second time only to lose on penalty shootout. Two years later, though, they knocked out five clubs, including some of those regarded as contenders for the title, and victoriously completed the Cup season without conceding a single goal in 630 minutes.

Being a three-times participant and two-times winner of the Cup final during the decade, Gagra have achieved one of the best results among the Georgian clubs.

Records and statistics

League and cup history

Notes

European history
As the winners of the 2010/11 Cup competition, Gagra took part in UEFA Europa League second qualifying round against the high-flying Anorthosis Famagusta. Widely regarded as favourites of the tie, the Cypriot side had a clear advantage in Larnaca, which resulted in 3-0 victory, but Gagra fought back in the second leg held in Zestafoni. They scored an early goal, shortly afterwards increased the lead, although eventually failed to equalize the aggregate score.

Current squad 
As of 28 February 2023

 (C)

Personnel

Management

Shirt sponsors and manufacturers

Honours
 Erovnuli Liga 2
 Winners (2): 2007–08, 2010–11
 Runners-up (2): 2016, 2021
 Third place (5): 2005-06, 2006-07, 2014-15, 2018, 2020 
 Georgian Cup 
 Winners (2): 2010–11, 2020

Managers

 Kakhi Karanadze (2004–2009)
 Viktor Kashchey (2009)
 Vladimer Khachidze (2009–2010)
 Anatoliy Piskovets (2010–2011)
 Varlam Kilasonia (2011)
 Zviad Jeladze (2011–2012)
 Tengiz Sichinava (2014)
 Anatoliy Piskovets (2015-2017)
 Denys Khomutov (2017–2018)
 Gaga Kirkitadze (since 2019)

Notable players
Georgian national team member Tornike Okriashvili started his career as a professional player in this club in 2009/2010, before moving to Shakhtar Donetsk on loan.

References

External links
Official Site
Profile at uefa.com

 
Football clubs in Georgia (country)
Association football clubs established in 2004
2004 establishments in Georgia (country)
Association football clubs established in 2006